Tariq Mahmood Bajwa is a Pakistani politician who had been a member of the National Assembly of Pakistan from 2008 to 2013.

Political career
He was elected to the National Assembly of Pakistan from Constituency NA-75 (Faisalabad-I) as a candidate of Pakistan Peoples Party (PPP) in 2008 Pakistani general election. He received 83,699 votes and defeated Ghulam Rasool Sahi, a candidate of Pakistan Muslim League (Q) (PML-Q). In the same election, he ran for the seat of the Provincial Assembly of the Punjab as an independent candidate from Constituency PP-51 (Faisalabad-I) but was unsuccessful. He received 92 votes and lost the seat to Haji Liaqat Ali, a candidate of PPP.

He ran for the seat of the National Assembly from Constituency NA-75 (Faisalabad-I) as a candidate of PPP in 2013 Pakistani general election but was unsuccessful. He received 9,916 votes and lost the seat to Ghulam Rasool Sahi.

References

Living people
Pakistani MNAs 2008–2013
Pakistan People's Party politicians
Punjabi people
Year of birth missing (living people)